This is a list of pyramid mausoleums in North America. This Egyptian Revival funerary architecture was generally an extravagance of American tycoons who wanted themselves remembered as long and as well as the ancient pharaohs.

Individuals and families

 Henry Bergh Pyramid Mausoleum, Green-Wood Cemetery, Brooklyn, New York
 Bradbury Mausoleum, Mountain View Cemetery (Oakland, California)
 Leslie C. Brand, Brand Park, Glendale, California
 William Harry Brown Pyramid, Homewood Cemetery, Pittsburgh, Pennsylvania (1898–1899)
 Marcus Brown Pyramid, Oakhill Cemetery, Grand Rapids, Michigan, design inspired by Pyramid of Cestius in Rome
 Brunswig Mausoleum, Metairie Cemetery, New Orleans, Louisiana
 Nicolas Cage's Future Tomb, Saint Louis Cemetery No. 1, New Orleans, Louisiana
 Confederate Memorial Pyramid, Hollywood Cemetery, Richmond, Virginia
 Dorn Pyramid, Oddfellows Cemetery, San Luis Obispo, California
 Gardel Memorial, Mount Vernon Cemetery, Philadelphia, Pennsylvania
 Lewis Grigsby Crypt, Angelus-Rosedale Cemetery, Los Angeles, California
 John Gunckel Monument, Woodlawn Cemetery (Toledo, Ohio), Toledo, Ohio

 Gwin Mausoleum,  Mountain View Cemetery, Oakland, California
 Harms Family Mausoleum, Flower Hill Cemetery (North Bergen, New Jersey)
 Mark Howard Pyramid, Cedar Hill Cemetery, Hartford, Connecticut
 George W. P. Hunt, Hunt's Tomb, Phoenix, Arizona
A.R.S. Hunter Pyramid, Murphy, North Carolina
 Pyramid tomb of Major E.C Lewis, Mt Olivet Cemetery, Nashville, TN 
 Longstreet Mausoleum, Oakwood Cemetery, Syracuse, New York
 C.O.G. Miller Pyramid Mausoleum, Mountain View Cemetery, Oakland, California
 Mongin Family, Bonaventure Cemetery, Savannah, Georgia
 Charles Debrille Poston, Poston Butte, Florence, Arizona
 Rucker Family Tomb, Evergreen Cemetery, Everett, Washington
 Sahlberg Pyramid, Santa Barbara Cemetery, Santa Barbara, California
 Schoenhofen Pyramid Mausoleum, Graceland Cemetery, Chicago, Illinois
 Shatto family, Angelus-Rosedale Cemetery, Los Angeles, California
 Dr. Ira Smith's Pyramid, Grace Episcopal Church Cemetery, St. Francisville, Louisiana
 Wm. Smith's Pyramid, Magnolia Cemetery, Charleston, South Carolina
 Van Ness/Parsons Mausoleum, Green-Wood Cemetery, Brooklyn, NY
Vanderbilt family, Moravian Cemetery, Staten Island, NY
 Joel Parker Whitney, Spring Valley Ranch, Rocklin, California

Known but unidentified
 Spring Grove Cemetery, Cincinnati, Ohio

Multiple burials
 Forest Lawn South, Miami, Florida
 Egbert Ludovicus Viele and his second wife, West Point, New York

See also
 Lists of pyramids
 Mesoamerican pyramids

References

Pyramid maus
Pyramids in North America
Pyramids in North America